Eupithecia orana is a moth in the family Geometridae. It is found on the Canary Islands and in Spain and North Africa.

References

Moths described in 1913
orana
Moths of Europe
Moths of Africa